Remember is the third studio album by South Korean boy band Winner. The album was released on April 9, 2020, by YG Entertainment. The album contains 12 tracks, including the pre-release single "Hold" and the title track "Remember", which were written by Mino. The physical version is available in two versions: Us, and You. Remember is the follow-up to their third extended play Cross, released in 2019.

Background and development
On March 17, 2020, YG Entertainment revealed the date for the single "Hold" to be March 26. On March 18, YG Entertainment revealed the date for the album Remember to be April 9 and that 12 songs would be on the album. On March 19, YG Entertainment confirmed the group's collaboration with Lee Su-hyun for the music video of "Hold". On March 24, YG Entertainment posted the first teaser for the music video of "Hold". On March 25, YG Entertainment posted the second teaser for the music video of "Hold".

On April 1, YG Entertainment posted the album track listing, revealing that Remember contains eight new songs, including pre-release single "Hold" and lead single "Remember", and "four of the most loved songs from our first album as four-membered versions". On April 7, YG Entertainment posted the first teaser for the music video of "Remember". On April 8, YG posted the second teaser for the music video of "Remember".

Music and composition
In an interview with Soompi, Yoon described "Just Dance" as "a fun track with a message" and "My Bad" as "a sexy, mid-tempo track that he’s had in his archives for a while". He went on to say that "Well" "was inspired by his statement to fans at live broadcasts: 'Eat well, sleep well, rest well.' Written and composed by Lee Seung Hoon, 'Serenade' is the rapper’s solo track that perfectly captures the excitement from concerts".

Critical reception

Gina of Seoulbeats wrote that "the album combines new and old, fun and somber tracks to provide a diverse experience of Winner’s capabilities" and called it "a very refined album, one that’ll truly be a pleasant surprise from start to finish".

Eric Wirsing of Allkpop described the album as "fairly mellow" with "few club bangers, but also more than a few softer cuts".

Track listing

Charts

Album

Singles

References

2020 albums
Winner (band) albums
YG Entertainment albums